John C. Trever (November 26, 1916 – April 29, 2006) was a Biblical scholar and archaeologist, who was involved in the discovery of the Dead Sea Scrolls.

Education
Trever received a degree (B.D.) from Yale Divinity School and a Ph.D. in Old Testament studies from Yale Graduate School. He did post-doctoral studies in archaeology through the American School of Oriental Research in Jerusalem.

Career
He became the first American scholar to see fragments of the Dead Sea Scrolls in the Spring of 1948. At the time Trever was filling in for William F. Albright, the director at the American Schools of Oriental Research. He was contacted by a representative of Mar Samuel of St. Mark's Assyrian Orthodox Monastery who desired to authenticate three scrolls that we now know had been purchased from Kando, a Syrian-Christian antiquities dealer in Bethlehem. Trever, an experienced photographer, photographed the scrolls, 1QIsaiahA, 1QpHabukkuk, and 1QS, and immediately sent copies to Near East scholar William F. Albright, who recognized them as the "greatest MS discovery of modern times!”

Trever is the author of "The Untold Story of Qumran" (1965) and "The Dead Sea Scrolls: A Personal Account" (2003). He taught at several colleges: Baldwin-Wallace College in Ohio, Morris Harvey College in West Virginia (the University of Charleston), and Claremont School of Theology in California.

The original negatives are in the collection of the Ancient Biblical Manuscript Center of the Claremont School of Theology in California.

Selected works

Book

Further reading
 Abegg, Martin. "John C. Trever." Biblical Archaeology Review, September/October, 2006.
 Shanks, Hershel. Mystery and Meaning of the Dead Sea Scrolls (New York: Vintage Books, 1998).
 Trever, John C., The Untold Story of Qumran (Westwood: Fleming H. Revell Company, 1965).

References

External links
 Ancient Biblical Manuscript Center.

American biblical scholars
Dead Sea Scrolls
1916 births
2006 deaths
Yale Divinity School alumni
Yale Graduate School of Arts and Sciences alumni